Peter Pakosh (June 11, 1911 – February 20, 1999) was co-founder of the Versatile tractor company, and is credited with many inventions and equipment innovations including the modern-day grain auger used by combine harvesters. He is considered an innovator in the field of agricultural machinery on a level with John Deere and Cyrus McCormick.

Versatile was the first company to mass-produce articulated four-wheel drive tractors, starting in 1966 with the D100 and G100 four-wheel drives. Those ground-breaking tractors were primitive by modern standards, with a 6-cylinder diesel or 8-cylinder gas engine producing 100 horsepower. 1966 models sold for less than CA$10,000.

Four-wheel drive demand increased significantly, with Versatile becoming one of the leaders in four-wheel drive development and production. By the late 1970s the Versatile lineup included tractors ranging from 220 to 330 horsepower. With the 1980s came an expanded line of four-wheel drive tractors that stretched to 470 horsepower in the Versatile 1150.

In 1993, the Association of Equipment Manufacturers (formerly EMI), a trade association for manufacturers of agricultural and construction equipment, selected Pakosh as one of "100 Significant Contributors and Contributions to the Mechanization of Agriculture and Construction".

In 2009, the Canadian Manufacturers and Exporters (CME) announced that Pakosh will be inducted into the Manitoba Manufacturers' Hall of Fame as a pioneer.

Further reading

External links
www.versatile-tractors.com
www.versatile-ag.ca- Versatile Tractor Brand

1911 births
1999 deaths
20th-century Canadian inventors